Arthur Eugene Holder (born Waterford, St. Michael) is a Barbadian politician and lawyer. He is a Member of the House of Assembly of Barbados. Holder has been serving as the Speaker of the House of Assembly of Barbados since 5 June 2018.

Early life and career 
Arthur Eugene Holder was born in Waterford, Saint Michael. He attended the University of the West Indies and had his post-graduate at the Barry University, Miami.

Holder was the senior advocate at Holder and company. He was the Manager of the Barbados Child Care Board and the programme officer with the National Council on Substance Abuse. In 2013, Holder contested for the Barbados House of Assembly and lost. In 2018, he ran again for office and won. He was elected member of the Barbados House of Assembly in 2018. Immediately after being elected he was appointed the Speaker of the Barbados House of Assembly.

He is a member of the Barbados Labour Party.

References 

Barbadian politicians
Speakers of the House Assembly of Barbados
Members of the House of Assembly of Barbados
University of the West Indies alumni
Barry University alumni
Barbados Labour Party politicians
Year of birth missing (living people)
Living people